Mahiben Maruthappu  (born 1988) is a British physician, entrepreneur, academic researcher and health policy specialist. He co-founded Cera, a home healthcare company and one of the largest social care providers in the UK. He was the founder and first President of the United Kingdom Medical Students' Association (UKMSA). He co-founded the National Health Service (NHS) Innovation Accelerator (NIA), a program that accelerates the adoption of new healthcare technologies, and served as NHS England's Innovation Adviser. He has contributed to more than 60 research papers in peer-reviewed journals.

Maruthappu was appointed Member of the Order of the British Empire (MBE) in the 2020 New Year Honours for services to Health and Social Care technology. He was named in the 2015 Forbes’ 30 under 30 list.

Early life and education
Maruthappu was born in London in 1988. He studied preclinical medicine at Selwyn College, Cambridge, where he graduated with a triple first class, and as a student ran several charities, including CONTACT and Medic to Medic. He studied clinical medicine at Green Templeton College, Oxford and in his fifth year founded the United Kingdom Medical Students' Association (UKMSA), which provided free educational resources to over 40,000 students.  He was also a Kennedy Scholar in Global Health at Harvard University, where he conducted research at Harvard's Center for Surgery and Public Health.

Medical practice
Maruthappu began his career as a physician at Ealing Hospital in 2013. He later practised at Chelsea & Westminster Hospital NHS Foundation Trust and then trained in Public Health. In 2014, he was appointed scholar at National Institute for Health and Care Excellence, where he focused on the use of structured feedback in surgery.

NHS Policy 
in 2014 Maruthappu became the first appointed Senior Fellow to the Chief Executive Officer of NHS England, Simon Stevens.

Whilst at the NHS, Maruthappu advised on innovation, technology and prevention, and in 2015, he co-founded the NHS Innovation Accelerator (NIA), a programme aimed at spreading  technologies across the health service, that also led to the development of the first NHS Innovation Tariff, a national reimbursement mechanism for medical technologies and digital health products. Maruthappu has been described as the “whizzkid helping save the NHS”.

He co-founded the NHS's £450 million Workplace Wellness Programme and the Diabetes Prevention Programme (DPP), which as of 2017 had been rolled out to half of the population in England.  He led NHS England's contribution to the Government's Childhood Obesity Plan and originated the NHS Sugar Tax, which preceded the UK Government’s Soft Drinks Industry Levy and so-called Sugar Tax.

Entrepreneurship 
After his mother fell and fractured part of her back, Maruthappu faced difficulties in arranging required home care. He subsequently co-founded Cera, a social care provider that uses an on-demand digital platform to match people seeking in-home assistance with professional carers, allowing families to keep updated on a patient's progress, while also using Artificial Intelligence to predict potential health deteriorations in patients.

Under Maruthappu, within 3 years Cera reached over 6,000 employees, 20 offices, and 30,000 care visits being delivered a day, while securing over $90 million of financing, making Cera one of the largest health technology companies in Europe.

Boards, affiliations, and related endeavours
Maruthappu is an associate Board Member of Imperial College Healthcare NHS Trust, one of the largest NHS Trusts in the country, with £GBP 1.2 billion turnover, and a Board Member of Skills for Care, the national body for the UK’s 1.5 million care workforce. He is also a member of the advisory board for HealthTechDigital He was a Founding Board Member of Digital Health London.

He writes for The Guardian and Forbes, and has lectured undergraduate students at Cambridge University since the age of 20.

Research and selected publications
Maruthappu’s research focuses on public health, innovation and health economics.

He subsequently partook in the ‘landmark’ 2018 study demonstrating that health & social care funding constraints in England were linked to 120,000 excess deaths; a so called ‘mortality gap’. The study called for over £20 billion of additional investment into the health and care system.

Bibliography
Maruthappu M. Sugandh K. Medical School: The Applicant’s Guide, Doctors Academy Ltd., 2013 and 2010, 
Maruthappu M. Sugandh K. Medical School: The Undergraduate’s Guide Doctors Academy Ltd., 2013

Recognition and acknowledgements
 Forbes''' 30 under 30
 LaingBuisson Rising Star
 Financial Times Top 10 most influential BAME tech leaders in UK 
 Wired'' Top 10 Innovators in Healthcare
 2017 Technology Leader Award (Disruptive Leader of the Year)

References

External links
 Cera
 NHS UK 
 UKMSA

21st-century English medical doctors
English medical researchers
English businesspeople
1988 births
Living people
Alumni of Selwyn College, Cambridge
Alumni of Green Templeton College, Oxford
Members of the Order of the British Empire
Kennedy Scholarships